Wudadao Subdistrict is a subdistrict on the southeastern side of Heping District, Tianjin. it borders Xiaobailou Subdistrict in its north, Dayingmen and Taoyuan Subdistricts in its southeast, as well as Xinxing and Nanyingmen Subdistricts in its west. In 2010, the census counter 41,521 residents for this subdistrict.

Prior to 2014, this subdistrict was known as Tiyuguan Subdistrict. The current name literally means "Fifth Avenue".

History

Administrative divisions 
In the year 2021, There were a total of 13 communities under Wudadao Subdistrict. They are listed in the table below:

Gallery

References 

Township-level divisions of Tianjin
Heping District, Tianjin